Usher is a surname. Notable people with the surname include:

 Andrew Usher, Edinburgh distiller
 Bazoline Estelle Usher (1885–1992), American educator
 Bob Usher (1925–2014), Baseball player
 Charles Usher (1865–1942), Scottish ophthalmologist
 David Usher, Canadian recording artist
 Elaine Usher (1932-2014), was an English actress who was known for her work on British television
 Graham Usher (dancer) (1938–1975) ballet dancer with the Royal Ballet
 Graham Usher (bishop), Bishop of Dudley
 Guy Usher (1883-1944), American actor
 Hezekiah Usher, first bookseller in the thirteen colonies
 James Usher (or Ussher) (1581–1656), Archbishop of Armagh, 1625–1656
 James Ward Usher, benefactor of the Usher Gallery, in Lincoln, United Kingdom
 Jessie T. Usher, American actor
 John Palmer Usher, U.S. administrator, cabinet member of Abraham Lincoln
 Karyn Usher, American television producer and screenwriter
 Leila Usher (1859-1955), American artist
 Michael Usher, Australian journalist and newsreader for Nine News
 Paul Usher, English actor
 Richard Usher (1785–1843), English clown

Occupational surnames
English-language occupational surnames